Louis Béland-Goyette (born September 15, 1995) is a Canadian professional soccer player who plays as a midfielder.

Club career

Montreal Impact
Béland-Goyette began 2014 with USL PDL club Montreal Impact U23, where he made 8 appearances.

He signed his first professional contract with the Montreal Impact on September 12, 2014. He made his debut as a 75th-minute substitute during a 1-2 loss to the New England Revolution a day later on September 13. On March 26, 2015 Béland-Goyette was removed from Montreal's first team roster and added to FC Montreal, ahead of their inaugural season in the USL. He made his debut against Toronto FC II on March 28.

After two seasons with FC Montreal in which he captained the team, Béland-Goyette signed with the first team for a second time in November 2016.

Béland-Goyette was released by Montreal at the end of their 2018 season.

Valour FC
On April 9, 2019, Béland-Goyette signed with Canadian Premier League side Valour FC. He made his debut in Valour's inaugural game against Pacific FC on May 1. Béland-Goyette scored his first goal for Valour on August 19 against FC Edmonton.

HFX Wanderers
On January 8, 2020, Béland-Goyette signed with HFX Wanderers. He made his debut on August 15 against Pacific FC.

International career
Béland-Goyette has represented Canada at the U-18 and U-20 level. He was a part of the U-20 squad that went to the 2014 Milk Cup. He later made the team for the 2015 CONCACAF U-20 Championship and the Canadian U23 national team at the 2015 Pan American Games. In May 2016, Béland-Goyette was called to Canada's U23 national team for a pair of friendlies against Guyana and Grenada. He saw action in both matches.

In October 2017, Béland-Goyette received his first call-up to the Canadian senior team for a friendly against El Salvador, but didn't appear in the match.

Honours
HFX Wanderers
 Canadian Premier League
Runners-up: 2020

References

External links
 
 

1995 births
Living people
Association football midfielders
Canadian soccer players
Soccer people from Quebec
People from Pointe-Claire
Canadian expatriate soccer players
Expatriate footballers in Malta
Canadian expatriate sportspeople in Malta
Montreal Impact U23 players
CF Montréal players
FC Montreal players
Valour FC players
HFX Wanderers FC players
Gudja United F.C. players
Canadian Soccer League (1998–present) players
USL League Two players
Major League Soccer players
USL Championship players
Canadian Premier League players
Maltese Premier League players
Canada men's youth international soccer players
Canada men's under-23 international soccer players
2015 CONCACAF U-20 Championship players
Footballers at the 2015 Pan American Games
Homegrown Players (MLS)
Pan American Games competitors for Canada